Musaeus, Musaios or Musäus may refer to:

Greek poets
 Musaeus of Athens, legendary polymath, considered by the Greeks to be one of their earliest poets (mentioned by Socrates in Plato's Apology)
 Musaeus of Ephesus, lived after 241 BCE
 Musaeus Grammaticus, lived probably in the beginning of the 6th century
 Musaeus of Massilia, lived in the first half of the 5th century

Other uses
 Musaeus (officer of Antiochus III) (fl. 190 BCE), Seleucid Empire 
 Musaeus College, a private girls' school in Colombo, Sri Lanka
 10749 Musäus, a main belt asteroid
 Musaeus (spider), a spider genus of the family Thomisidae

See also
 Musäus, a surname